Canoe Lake is a lake in Parry Sound District, Ontario, Canada.

See also
List of lakes in Ontario

References

Lakes of Parry Sound District